Armelle Faesch (born ) is a French female former volleyball player, playing as a setter. She was part of the France women's national volleyball team.

She competed at the 2011 Women's European Volleyball Championship. On club level she played for ASPTT Mulhouse.

References

1981 births
Living people
Sportspeople from Mulhouse
French women's volleyball players
Place of birth missing (living people)